The Street Orphans were a gang of lesbian youth formed in Tenderloin, San Francisco. They participated in the Compton's Cafeteria Riot in 1966, and, along with the gay youth organization Vanguard, helped form San Francisco's chapters of the Gay Liberation Front and the Gay Activists Alliance.

References

LGBT history in San Francisco
Former gangs in San Francisco
Lesbian organizations in the United States